Taşpınar or Concik is a village in the Rize District, Rize Province, in Black Sea Region of Turkey. Its population is 342 (2021).

History 
According to list of villages in Laz language book (2009), name of the village is Conceva.

Geography

References

Villages in Rize District